Royal Air Force Station Keevil or more simply RAF Keevil  is a former Royal Air Force station located between the villages of Keevil and Steeple Ashton, about   east of the town of Trowbridge, in Wiltshire, England.

The airfield was built on a site previously ear-marked for the purpose in the mid-1930s. With three long concrete runways, the airfield was used by the Royal Air Force and the United States Army Air Forces Eighth and Ninth Air Forces.

Although no longer a RAF station and now known as Keevil Airfield, it is maintained for military use and used for training purposes, predominantly by aircraft from RAF Brize Norton and Joint Helicopter Command.

History

Spitfire assembly 
After air raids in 1940 on the Spitfire production plants near Southampton, the Trowbridge area was one of several chosen for dispersal of production. At first parts were made, and later complete aircraft after completion of a purpose-built factory at Bradley Road, Trowbridge. Fuselages and wings were taken on Queen Mary trailers to an assembly shed on the edge of the airfield near Steeple Ashton village, then flown out by the Air Transport Auxiliary.

USAAF use
In 1942 Keevil airfield was provided to the USAAF and was assigned USAAF designation 471 (KV).

62nd Troop Carrier Group
The first American unit assigned to Keevil was the 62nd Troop Carrier Group, arriving at Keevil on 6 September 1942 from Florence AAF, South Carolina.  The group consisted of the following operational squadrons:
 4th Troop Carrier Squadron
 7th Troop Carrier Squadron
 8th Troop Carrier Squadron
 51st  Troop Carrier Squadron

The group transported military freight and supplies using C-47 and C-53 aircraft.  The unit remained in England until 15 November until being transferred to  Tafaraoui Airfield, Algeria as part of Twelfth Air Force.

153d Observation Squadron
After the departure of the transport group, Keevil saw the arrival of the 153rd Observation Squadron from the 67th Recon Group at RAF Membury in December 1942.

From Keevil the squadron flew a combination of Douglas Bostons, Douglas A-20 Havocs and Supermarine Spitfires. In March 1944 the 153d OS was disbanded, then re-formed for duties as the 2911th Bomb Squadron as a liaison and communications squadron, being equipped with Stinson L5s at RAF Erlestoke.

363d Fighter Group

On 20 December 1943, the Ninth Air Force 363d Fighter Group moved to Keevil from Sacramento AAF California.  The group consisted of the following operational squadrons:
 380th Fighter Squadron
 381st Fighter Squadron
 382d Fighter Squadron

The group awaited its operational aircraft until 22 January 1944 when the group moved to RAF Rivenhall in Essex.

RAF Fighter Command use
With the departure of the Americans, the RAF used Keevil beginning in March 1944 for 196 and 299 Squadron. Short Stirling glider tugs of No. 38 Group RAF arrived, followed by a large number of Horsa gliders, crewed by Army pilots of the Glider Pilot Regiment.

The RAF Stirling aircraft were crewed by RAF, RCAF, RAAF, RNZAF and SAAF personnel and were engaged in SOE and SAS drops. largely in France, and in glider towing.   Their involvement in the Normandy invasion of France and Operation Market-Garden is well remembered by Keevil and Steeple Ashton villagers.   Casualties of army and air force personnel were heavy and a number of aircraft were lost.

RAF Flying Training Command use
The departure of these units to East Anglia brought Keevil to a training role when in October 1944 No.22 Heavy Glider Conversion Unit arrived, with their twin-engined Albemarle aircraft and Waco Hadrian Gliders.

They in turn were replaced in June 1945 by 61 Operation Training Unit converting newly qualified pilots on to Spitfires and, later, on to Mustangs.  61 OTU in due course became 203 Advanced Flying School and moved to Chivenor in Devon in July 1947 and this marked the end of RAF Keevil as a fully staffed and equipped operational airfield.

Postwar military use
Between 1955 and 1964 the United States Air Force used the base occasionally.  During 1956 and 1957, Keevil was used as a satellite airfield for "ab initio" training by No 2 Flying Training School, based at RAF Hullavington. Aircraft included the Mk 1 Percival Jet Provost. Keevil was kept in reserve status until 1965 when it was closed.

Current use
Keevil airfield is virtually complete with all of its runways, perimeter track and many of the hardstands still in place.  It is regularly used for British Army and RAF exercises; a monthly flying schedule is published by RAF Brize Norton.

Since 1992 it has been home to Bannerdown Gliding Club, a Royal Air Force Gliding & Soaring Association (RAFGSA) club, affiliated to RAF Brize Norton since the closure of RAF Lyneham. The airfield is occasionally used as a motorsport circuit for various events and is also used by the Wessex Model Flying Club.

In September 1994 the Keevil Society, organised by Paul Vingoe, held a Commemorative Day to mark the 50th anniversary of the D-Day and Arnhem operations and to dedicate a memorial to all who served at Keevil, especially those who flew from there and lost their lives.

In 2012, proposals were made to add a 4th runway parallel to 06/24, a Tactical Landing Zone – a copy of a temporary battlefield runway – by breaking up some of the hard surfaces.

See also

List of former Royal Air Force stations
United States Air Force in the United Kingdom

References

Citations

Bibliography
 Freeman, Roger A. (1994) UK Airfields of the Ninth: Then and Now 1994. After the Battle 
 Freeman, Roger A. (1996) The Ninth Air Force in Colour: UK and the Continent – World War Two. After the Battle 
 Maurer, Maurer (1983). Air Force Combat Units Of World War II. Maxwell AFB, Alabama: Office of Air Force History. .
 Russell, C. R. (1985). Spitfire Odyssey: My Life at Supermarines 1936–1957. Kingfisher Railway Productions.

External links 

 Bannerdown Gliding Club
Keevil Scheduled Military Local Training Sorties
Wessex Model Flying Club

Airfields of the IX Fighter Command in the United Kingdom
Gliderports in the United Kingdom
Royal Air Force stations in Wiltshire